Henry County is a county located in the U.S. state of Illinois. The 2010 United States Census, listed its population at 50,486. Its county seat is Cambridge.

Henry County is included in the Davenport-Moline-Rock Island, IA-IL Metropolitan Statistical Area.

History
Henry County was formed on January 13, 1825, out of Fulton County, Illinois. It is named for Patrick Henry, Revolutionary War firebrand and champion of individual rights, to whom the slogan "give me liberty, or give me death" is attributed. The county was settled by people from New England and western New York, descendants of English Puritans who settled New England in the colonial era. The New England settlers founded the five towns of Andover, Wethersfield, Geneseo, Morristown and La Grange.

The settlement of Cambridge came about in 1843, when the owner of the land in that area (Rev. Ithamar Pillsbury) dedicated a section of his properties to a town council; lots were sold to incoming settlers, and construction of the town proper began on 9 June 1843. The incoming "Yankee" settlers made Henry County culturally similar to early New England culture.

Geography
It is the 29th largest of Illinois' 102 counties. The area is fairly flat, with elevations ranging from 650 feet above sea level in the northwest to 850 in the southeast. About  or 86.7% of the county's land area, is used for agriculture.

Climate and weather

Major highways

  Interstate 74
  Interstate 80
  Interstate 280
  U.S. Highway 6
  U.S. Highway 34
  Illinois Route 17
  Illinois Route 78
  Illinois Route 81
  Illinois Route 82
  Illinois Route 84
  Illinois Route 92
  Illinois Route 93

Adjacent counties

 Rock Island County - northwest
 Whiteside County - northeast
 Bureau County - east
 Stark County - southeast
 Knox County - south
 Mercer County - west

Demographics

As of the 2010 United States Census, there were 50,486 people, 20,373 households, and 14,149 families residing in the county. The racial makeup of the county was 94.8% white, 1.6% black or African American, 0.4% Asian, 0.2% American Indian, 1.6% from other races, and 1.4% from two or more races. Those of Hispanic or Latino origin made up 4.8% of the population. In terms of ancestry, 30.0% were German, 14.6% were Irish, 12.3% were Swedish, 11.5% were English, and 7.2% were American.

Of the 20,373 households, 31.1% had children under the age of 18 living with them, 55.9% were married couples living together, 9.5% had a female householder with no husband present, 30.6% were non-families, and 26.1% of all households were made up of individuals. The average household size was 2.44 and the average family size was 2.92. The median age was 41.8 years.

The median income for a household in the county was $49,164 and the median income for a family was $61,467. Males had a median income of $44,589 versus $30,992 for females. The per capita income for the county was $24,915. About 6.8% of families and 10.4% of the population were below the poverty line, including 16.9% of those under age 18 and 8.7% of those age 65 or over.

Communities

Cities

 Colona
 Galva
 Geneseo
 Kewanee

Towns
 Annawan
 Atkinson

Villages

 Alpha
 Andover
 Bishop Hill
 Cambridge
 Cleveland
 Coal Valley (partial)
 Hooppole
 Orion
 Woodhull

Unincorporated communities

 Aliceville
 Briar Bluff
 Brook Lawn
 Dayton
 German Corner
 Green River
 Green Rock
 Hickory Hills
 Level Acres
 Lynn Center
 Morristown
 Nekoma
 Opheim
 Osco
 Shady Beach
 Sunny Hill
 Sunny Hill Estates
 Timber Ridge
 Ulah
 Warner
 Woodcrest

Former communities
 Kedron
 Oxford
 Saxon

Townships

 Alba
 Andover
 Annawan
 Atkinson
 Burns
 Cambridge
 Clover
 Colona
 Cornwall
 Edford
 Galva
 Geneseo
 Hanna
 Kewanee
 Loraine
 Lynn
 Munson
 Osco
 Oxford
 Phenix
 Weller
 Western
 Wethersfield
 Yorktown

Politics

Henry County's political history is fairly typical of many Yankee-settled rural counties in Illinois. After being largely Democratic in its first few elections, the county turned powerfully Republican for the 110 years following the formation of that party. The only time it did not vote Republican between 1856 and 1960 was in 1912 when the GOP was mortally divided and Progressive Theodore Roosevelt won a majority of the county's ballots. In 1964, when the Republican Party nominated the Southern-oriented Barry Goldwater, Henry County voted Democratic for the first time since 1852, but as was typical for Yankee counties it returned to the Republicans with the selection of the more moderate Richard Nixon.

In the 1980s, the transition of the Republican Party into a party largely based around Southern Evangelicals severely alienated its historic Yankee base: Henry County turned to Democrat Michael Dukakis in 1988, and voted Democratic in every election between 1988 and 2012 except that of 2004 when George W. Bush carried the county by 5.1 percent. However, concern with unemployment in the “Rust Belt” resulted in a powerful swing to Republican Donald Trump in 2016 – the worst Democratic result in the county since Jimmy Carter in 1980.

See also
 National Register of Historic Places listings in Henry County, Illinois

References

External links
 
 
 Henry County Tourism Bureau
 Illinois Ancestors Henry County
 Henry County Historical Society

 
1825 establishments in Illinois
Illinois counties
Populated places established in 1825
Quad Cities